Kinship analysis is any analysis that deals with kinship. Such analyses are used in many different disciplines of research, where analysis is conducted in different ways.

In anthropology, kinship analysis is normally either the analysis of social practices related to kinship, or the analysis of systems of kinship terminology in different cultures.
In forensics, kinship analysis is used about forms of genetic profiling aimed at discovering possible genealogical relations between individuals based on DNA samples.